Wade's Causeway is a sinuous, linear monument up to 6,000 years old in the North York Moors national park in North Yorkshire, England. The gently cambered embankment is capped with unmortared and loosely abutted flagstones. Its original form is uncertain since it has been subjected to weathering and human damage.

The structure has been the subject of folklore in the surrounding area for several hundred years and possibly more than a millennium. Its construction was commonly attributed to a giant known as Wade, a figure from Germanic mythology. In the 1720s, the causeway was mentioned in a published text and became known outside the local area. Within a few years, it became of interest to antiquarians who visited the site and exchanged commentary on its probable historicity. They interpreted the structure as a causeway across the marshy ground, attributing its construction to the Roman military, an explanation largely unchallenged throughout the eighteenth and nineteenth centuries.

The stretch of the causeway on Wheeldale Moor was cleared of vegetation and excavated in the early twentieth century by a local gamekeeper interested in archaeology. The historian Ivan Margary agreed with its identification as a Roman road and assigned it the catalogue number 81b in the first edition of his Roman Roads In Britain (1957). The causeway was further excavated and studied by the archaeologist Raymond Hayes in the 1950s and 1960s, partly funded by the Council for British Archaeology. The results of his investigation concluded that the structure was a Roman road and were published in 1964 by the Scarborough Archaeological and Historical Society.

In the late twentieth and early twenty-first centuries, its identification as a Roman road has been questioned by academics, and alternative interpretations suggested for its purpose and date of construction. The monument's co-manager, English Heritage, in 2012, proposed several avenues of research that might be used to settle some of the questions that have arisen regarding its origins and usage.

Description

Situation and geology

The area through which the Wheeldale structure runs is predominantly uncultivated heather moorland. Hayes believes its appearance had remained fundamentally unchanged since the Bronze Age when its forest cover was removed to permit cultivation and grazing. Wheeldale Moor is poorly drained in places making it susceptible to flooding in both the ancient and modern eras. The underlying geology consists of patches of sand and gravel on top of mixed sandstone and oolitic limestone, known as Ravenscar Group strata.

Construction 

The causeway's visible section on Wheeldale Moor shows the remains of a continuous surface metalled with closely fitted slabs of sandstone with flat upper surfaces. The purpose of a central ridge along one section of the causeway, described in two independent excavations, is unknown. The stone flags are seated on a cambered base of mixed gravel, clay and either rubble, peat or soil, that forms a raised embankment.

Hayes and Rutter state that such an embankment's primary purpose would have been to provide good drainage for a road surface. Archaeologist David E Johnston states that the structure is crossed by numerous perpendicular drainage culverts with small becks trickling through them since the ground is often boggy. This could suggest a reason for the embankment, and its early attribution as a causeway—a route across the wetland, normally supported on earth or stone in the form of a raised embankment. Nineteenth-century antiquarian Thomas Codrington argued that Roman roads in Britain were generally built on embankments regardless of the underlying ground's drainage. He states that the common appellation of "causeway" in the names of Roman roads may, therefore, relate to their embankments rather than indicate that the ground on which they were constructed was ill-drained. Some historians translate Livy's phrase for Roman military construction of roads, via munire, as "making a causeway".

Johnston, historian Nikolaus Pevsner and landscape historian Richard Muir all agree that an original gravel surface dressing was once present on top of the stone of the Wheeldale structure. Whereas Johnston and Pevsner believe that the gravel was washed away through weathering, Muir states that human agents were primarily responsible for its removal. Both agree that the stonework remaining does not represent the original road surface. Statements by the eighteenth-century antiquary Francis Drake and nineteenth-century topographer Samuel Lewis that the writers found it to be "paved with a flint pebble" may support this theory, although Hayes and Rutter cast doubt on the accuracy of Drake's reports. Codrington states that in 1817 the causeway consisted of a "strong pavement of stones ... [with] above these another stratum of gravel ...", Hayes and Rutter state that "traces of a surface layer of gravel and small stones" remained visible in the 1960s, and professor of structural engineering John Knapton states that there remained some evidence of smaller surface-dressing pebbles as late as 1996.

Codrington and archaeologist Frank Elgee consider the structure was flanked in a few sections by lateral parallel ditches, but Hayes is doubtful whether they were part of the original construction or if they even existed.

Extant course 

The excavated portion of the Wheeldale structure—the only section of a postulated greater extent that remains clearly visible to the naked eye—consists of a  section on the eastern edge of Wheeldale Moor, facing Howl Moor. The presence of large quantities of stone on a raised agger, and the absence of much vegetation on its surface make the presence of the structure indisputable along this section. The causeway's course is linear along its visible section on Wheeldale Moor, consisting of several short, straight sections that occasionally pivot onto new alignments in a way not clearly demanded by the landscape. In 1855, several overgrown fragments of the structure were also reported visible at several points in the vicinity: near Morley Cross; east of Keys Beck; near Hazle houses; at July Park; and Castle Hill.

Possible extended course 

The structure is believed by several writers to extend far beyond its visible portion, but no significant sections of its conjectured course remain visible to the naked eye or have been excavated or extensively surveyed, and there is little agreement on an exact course that an extension may have taken.

To the north 

Early records of the causeway's course to the north—when its remains were apparently more readily visible than today—differ considerably from one another: the early geologist and natural historian George Young, who wrote concerning the causeway in his History of Whitby, makes no clear mention of the route of the structure north of Wheeldale Moor; it is unmarked on the 1854 Ordnance Survey map of the area, and eighteenth-century historian Thomas Hinderwell's mention of it passing near Hunt House suggests a greatly differing route to that marked on 2012 Ordnance Survey mapping. At least one source states that a "conjectural" continuation to the north is visible in vertical aerial photography. Hayes reports that in his survey in the 1950s, he found a "trace of the embankment" in one short section and "a patch of the metalling" in four additional sections along a route past Hazle Head and Julian Park.

Beyond Julian Park, it has been conjectured that the structure originally continued to the Roman garrison fort at Lease Rigg, southwest of Sleights, based on reports from antiquarians in the eighteenth and nineteenth centuries that fragments were visible at numerous points along this course. Hayes and Rutter appear confident of the structure's extent as far as Lease Rigg, but admit that its extent is conjectural from well short of that point, from Dowson Garth Quarry northwards.

Numerous authors have conjectured that the structure was a road that continued past Lease Rigg all the way to Roman coastal fortifications or signal stations somewhere near Whitby, but this is debated. Drake reports in 1736 that an associate had followed its course from Wheeldale Moor to the coast at Dunsley Bay. Still, Codrington is dismissive of his account, and whether the author meant to imply that a visible structure had been followed, or simply that the associate had followed a proposed route without encountering it, is unclear. In either case, the author did not verify sight of the structure along this course himself. Several sources after 1805 report the same endpoint for the road, but it is unclear whether they are echoing Drake or had visited the site themselves. Several authorities state that any termini beyond Lease Rigg are "doubtful" and "unproven", and Elgee states that the causeway's northern course "is obscure and its termination unknown". Hayes and Rutter in 1964 found no evidence for a continuation of the structure any further north than Lease Rigg. Other authorities argue for possible courses extending northwards to Goldsborough, Guisborough, or Sandsend Bay.

To the south 

It has also been suggested that the structure originally extended southwards from Wheeldale Moor to link up to the Roman Cawthorne Camp (sometimes spelt 'Cawthorn'). In the twentieth century English Heritage identified two sections of ground on Flamborough Rigg and Pickering Moor as extensions of the Wheeldale structure. Hayes states that the Flamborough Rigg section remained "clearly visible" as late as 1961, and that additional sections near Keys Beck were visible in aerial photography from 1946. The accounts of Hinderwell, Young, and Hayes & Rutter, as well as the 1854 and 2012 Ordnance Survey maps, appear to corroborate the stated course of the structure along this section.

There is further conjecture that the original structure's course may have gone beyond Cawthorne Camp to the Roman settlement of Derventio Brigantum (possibly either Stamford Bridge or modern-day Amotherby near Malton). Any postulated extension further south than Cawthorn is contested. Hinderwell reports in 1811 that the late Robert King had found evidence of a continuation of the causeway between "Newsom-bridge" and Broughton (a former township located near Appleton-le-Street). Hayes and Rutter failed to find any trace of the causeway south of Cawthorn along a route via Amotherby, Barugh or Newsham in their survey in the 1950s, and note that its course could not be determined as early as 1726.

Beyond Malton, there is a postulated stretch of Roman road leading towards York, which may be an extension of the causeway. Evidence for it is very slim: Drake mentioned it in 1736, but Codrington could find no trace of it in 1903, and writes that there is "some uncertainty as to the connexion". Archaeologists Philip Corder and John Kirk reported a possible section of Roman road at Brandrith Farm in 1928, but it is unknown whether this relates to the same structure as Drake observed, or has any association with the Wheeldale structure.

Legendary interpretations 

Historian Hector Munro Chadwick states that historical explanations for ancient structures would have been known to educated clergymen from the seventh century, but that structures were generally named by less educated people, often after mythological characters. Oral folklore in the North York Moors area from the Early Middle Ages has not generally survived into the modern era. Still, social historian Adam Fox states that the attribution of the causeway to Wade existed in oral folklore dating from at least as early as the Renaissance era. The folklore held that the causeway was built by a giant called Wade for his wife to take her cow to either market or pasture. In 1890, historian Thomas Bulmer records that:

The legend of Wade and his wife are reflected in alternative names for the structure that includes "Old Wife's Trod,"  "Auld Wife's Trod" and "Wade's Wife's Causey." The folklore of Wade was still common locally in the early nineteenth century. There is some confusion as to whether the name Bel or Bell relates to Wade's wife or his cow. Bulmer refers in 1890 to "[Wade's] wife, Bell" and Young also assigned the name to Wade's wife in 1817. Hayes (1964) accepts this attribution but antiquarian Hilda Ellis Davidson believes that the folkloric Bel refers to Wade's cow and reflects an earlier tradition of the "fairy" or bountiful cow. The earliest published source of the legend, from 1779, is ambiguous and refers to "Bell Wade's cow".

Etymological history of early names

Causeway

Several of the earliest sources refer to the structure as "Wade's Causeway", "Wade's Causey", and "Wade's Wife's Causey". The word causeway derives from the earlier English causey way or simply causey. Causey derives from the Middle English cauci, which derives from the Anglo-French causee, itself derived from the Medieval Latin calciata ("paved highway"), which ultimately may derive from the Latin calx (meaning "heel"). The derivation from calx can most likely be explained by the practice in the Ancient Roman era of consolidating earthworks through trampling with the heel of the foot.

Wade

It is not known for certain who the causeway is named after. Still, the figure was at the latest pre-Renaissance, and the majority of sources agree that it has its origins in the medieval period or earlier. The name Wade appears as one of the most common surnames in 1381 poll tax register from Suffolk, and philologist P H Reaney reports multiple instances of it from the 11th and 12th centuries. The names Wade or Wada were common in pre-medieval English history and historian William Searle records around a dozen historic Wades in his Onomasticon of early Anglo-Saxon names. The earliest figure from the region identified as Wade in extant writings is Duke Wada, a historical personage of Saxon descent who is recorded in 1083 as having been a prominent figure living in the Yorkshire area around 798. It is possible that this person was either named after—or has been conflated over time with—one of several earlier, mythological figures known as Wade. Chadwick states that it is most probable that the causeway is named directly after a well-known mythological, rather than historical, Wada.

The earliest origins of tales relating to a mythological Wade are confused and diverse. Linguist George McKnight states that the epic of Wade, although becoming a "mass of tales ... of the most diverse origin imaginable", was one of only a few clear examples of an epic from the Early Middle Ages surviving into Middle English. Geoffrey Chaucer, writing in the fourteenth century, refers to early English legends of Wade. Still, these no longer exist in their complete form. Walter Map, writing in the twelfth century, also mentions a Vandal prince Gado (thought to be a Latin form of Wade) in his fantastical lay De Nugus Curialium.

The Wades in these early English works likely relate to one or earlier legendary figures known as Wade, or variations thereof, in Northern European folklore and legend. Various authors suggest links to the giant Vaði, (also known as Witege, Vathe, Vidia, Widga, Vidga, Wadi or Vade) mentioned in the Norse Saga of Bern in the Þiðrekssaga; the Danish hero Wate, also called Wada; the Anglo-Saxon deity Wōden (also Wōđanaz or Wōđinaz), who was historically referred to as "heaven's giant"; and the German figure Wa-te, a fierce sea-king similar to Neptune, who reigns in Sturmland in the 7th-century saga Kudrun. Nurse and Chadwick identify all the above figures as being later facets of a single legendary character present in early, shared mythology of tribes living around the rim of the Baltic and North Seas.

There are possible etymological links between Wade's causeway and other UK archaeological sites: Wade's Gap on Hadrian's Wall in Northumbria; the Wansdyke that runs between Wiltshire and Somerset; and Wat's Dyke in the Welsh borders: all three have pre-modern origins. The latter two have sections contested as Roman in part.

Bel
There have been too few published studies on the etymology of the figure of Wade's Bel (whether that refers to his milkmaid wife or the cow) to provide a firm etymological or mythological basis. Wade is firmly rooted in Germanic mythology, and there are parallels between Wade's cow/milkmaid wife Bel and the milkmaid figure of Beyla in Norse mythology, who some authorities have suggested derives etymologically from baula, meaning cow. There is no published work suggesting such a link, so the origin of the figure remains unproven.

Skivick
It is thought that Skivick or Skivik, the local name for the section of the structure visible on Wheeldale Moor, could derive from two morphemes from Old Norse. The first syllable could derive from  skeið, which could mean either a track or farm road through a field, or from a word used to describe a course or boundary. The second syllable could derive from vík, meaning a bay or a nook between hills. Scandinavian or Norse place-names are common in Yorkshire and Norse peoples settled in the Yorkshire area from 870 AD onwards following raiding over the previous seventy years. Sawyer states that early Norse colonists had a profound effect on place-names in the areas in which they settled. Sedgefield states that the skeið derivation specifically in place-names within northern England points to a Scandinavian settlement of the area, but that due to the inheritance of language across generations, a place-name containing skeið may in any individual case have been applied any time between the ninth and fifteenth centuries. Historian Mary Atkin states that skeið place-names appear near Roman sites frequently enough to suggest an associative link.

Investigations, surveys and excavations

Discovery and initial records 

The sixteenth-century antiquarian John Leland passed through the area in around 1539 when compiling his Itineraries of local English history and mentions the nearby and mythologically-linked "Waddes Grave" – standing stones at Mulgrave near Whitby. He appears not to have had Wade's Causeway brought to his attention by local antiquarians since he makes no mention of it. In 1586, antiquarian William Camden makes passing note of the fact that, in parts of England, locals take "Roman fabriks to be the work of Gyants,"  but, although mentioned in the context of Roman roads, this appears to refer to the folklore of the time in general rather than to Wade's causeway specifically. He makes no mention of Wade's causeway by name, despite having toured the area, which—as Drake remarks in 1736—is "odd ... when he was upon the spot".

The first modern written record that unquestionably relates to the Wheeldale structure was in 1720 by the antiquarian John Warburton. This first publication of the structure's existence was followed by debate over the structure's function, course, and history amongst local historians and antiquarians in the eighteenth and nineteenth centuries, as its existence came to broader attention.

Drake personally visited and examined the structure's length and incorporated its description into one of his published works (1736). The causeway was also mentioned in nineteenth-century publications by Walley Oulton (1805), Thomas Hinderwell (1811), George Young (1817), John Phillips (1853), Robert Knox (1855), George Bevan (1884), John Atkinson (1894) and Ralph Horne (1897); and in the twentieth century by Thomas Codrington (1903), Boyd Dawkins, A Austen (1903), Frank Elgee (1912,1923,1933), Kitson Clark (1935), Ivan Margary (1957), Hayes & Rutter (1964) and Nikolaus Pevsner (1966).

Pre-war excavations 

The first recorded excavations of the structure are in the Victorian era. After performing some preliminary clearing of a part of the Wheeldale Moor section of the causeway in the 1890s, Wheeldale Lodge gamekeeper James Patterson persuaded the Office of Works (now the Department of the Environment) in 1912 to transfer into its stewardship the full  stretch of the causeway over Wheeldale Moor. Working alongside Oxley Grabham from the York Museum, members of the Yorkshire Archaeological Society and several private individuals, Patterson cleared and excavated the adopted stretch of the causeway between 1910 and 1920. A further section, near Grosmont Priory, was excavated by Hayes between 1936 and 1939.

Post-war excavations and surveys 

Historic England's PastScape website mentions; further, minor excavations of small sections of the causeway in 1946 and 1962, and archaeologist Hayes relates extensive excavations that he carried out between 1945 and 1950 at Riseborough, Cawthorn, Flamborough Rigg, Lease Rigg, Grosmont Priory and to the west of Aislaby. This work was partly funded by the Council for British Archaeology, and his findings were published in an extensive study titled Wade's Causeway in 1964. The previous year, the course of the structure across Wheeldale was surveyed by the Whitby Naturalists Club. English Heritage have also published records of later survey works by the Royal Commission on the Historical Monuments of England (1981) and Plowman Craven and Associates (1984).

The Royal Commission on the Historical Monuments of England (RCHME) undertook a theodolite survey of the causeway in 1992, and some limited excavations and analysis were carried out in 1997 during maintenance work on the structure. The most recent published survey that has been performed is an aerial survey carried out in 2010/2011 by Archaeological Research Services (ARS) as part of English Heritage's National Mapping Programme.

Future archaeological work 

Professor Pete Wilson, on behalf of English Heritage's Portico Properties Research Project, has suggested questions for future research and investigation of the site, including excavation to establish its date and function; examination of historical documentation for medieval mention of the use of the monument as a route or in a boundary dispute; and analysis of the site via a detailed aerial survey, lidar or other remote sensing technique to establish the extent of the monument beyond the length so far excavated.

The possibility also exists to apply newer techniques such as optically stimulated luminescence (OSL) testing to attempt to date any bricks, pottery, or other fired materials found in situ in the structure, a method that was successfully used in the identification of a suspected Roman road near Bayston Hill in Shropshire.

Theories on the structure's origins and purpose 

A wide variety of interpretations for the structure have led, in the absence of any hard evidence, to a broad range of proposed dates for its construction, from 4,500 BC to around 1485 AD. In archaeological excavations, no coins or other artefacts have been found on or around the structure to aid its dating, and no evidence has been gathered  through radiometric surveys. This has led to great difficulty in establishing even an approximate date for the causeway's construction. Attempts to date the structure have therefore relied on less precise means including etymology, the structure's probable relationship in the landscape to other structures of more precisely established date and function, and the comparison of the causeway's structure and fabrication to structures such as Roman roads.

As a Roman causeway

The first antiquarians to discuss the site in the eighteenth and nineteenth centuries dismissed early folkloric explanations of its origins. Roman roads were of particular interest to eighteenth-century antiquarians, and they sought to explain the Wheeldale structure in the context of Roman activity in the North York Moors area in the first and second centuries AD. Specifically, it was commonly suggested in their writings that the causeway was most probably constructed to connect the Roman Cawthorne Camp to the south with the Roman garrison fort at Lease Rigg near Grosmont to the north. The excavated section of the structure does lie linearly approximately between these two sites, which Knight et al. believe lend credence to its being of Roman origin.

One objection to identifying the road as Roman was that based on readings of the Iter Britanniarum—the section of the 4th-century Itinerary of Antoninus that lists major Roman Roads and stations within Britain—there had never been any major Roman roads in the area. In 1817, Young attempted to address this problem by arguing that the course of one of the identified iters (iter 1) had been misinterpreted and ran between Malton and Dunsley, passing through Wheeldale. Such an argument was possible because the Iter Britanniarum was not a map, but rather a list itinerary of roads and their distance between various settlements. Roman names for settlements were used in the document. Since many of these named sites had not been conclusively matched to contemporary settlements, identification of exact routes listed in the Iter was often difficult. There were few other objections at the time to the causeway's identification as a Roman road, and by the twentieth century, the causeway was commonly being referred to as the "Wheeldale Roman Road,"  or "Goathland Roman Road".

There was also support for the identification of the structure as a Roman road on etymological grounds. The early twentieth-century literary scholar Raymond Chambers argued that the name "Wade's causeway" is an example of Angle and Saxon settlers arriving in Britain and assigning the name of one of their heroes to a pre-existing local feature or area: if his argument that the structure was given its current name sometime during the Saxon era—between approximately 410 and 1066 AD—is accepted, then it must have been constructed before these dates. Atkin reaches a similar conclusion, arguing that the Norse morpheme skeið that is a partial root for Skivick, a local name for a section of the structure, is commonly found amongst Roman structures are discernible by later Saxon or Viking settlers. Hayes and Rutter also identify the structure as a Roman road, but using a quite different etymological argument: they state that there is an absence among the names of settlements along the causeway of the Anglo-Saxon morphemes ceaster  and stret and that, as per Codrington, these morphemes would be expected to be found in the names of several sites that lie alongside a former Roman road. They conclude that the absence of settlements with such names along the postulated extended course of Wade's Causeway indicates that the structure must already have been abandoned and of little significance by the Anglo-Saxon period, most likely by around 120 AD, and must therefore be of early Roman origin.

Several authorities who accepted the structure's interpretation as a Roman road attempted to make more precise estimates of the date of its construction by identifying periods of Roman military activity in the region since most Roman roads were of military construction. Historian Albert Norman, writing in 1960, states that the Wheeldale structure most probably dates from either the first or fourth-century AD but most sources appear to favour the first-century date: both historian Brian Hartley and Hayes & Rutter estimate around 80 AD; and Elgee estimates 86 AD. The earlier, first-century estimates assume that the road is Roman and that Roman road-building in the region occurred around the time that Gnaeus Julius Agricola was the Roman governor of Britain. Agricola made a concerted effort to expand and consolidate Roman control over lands of the Brigantes tribes in the North York Moors area in the 80s AD and is thought to have ordered the construction of nearby Lease Rigg fort. The fourth-century estimates, by contrast, assume that the tribes in the North York Moors area were either bypassed or subdued in the first century but that, being of little importance strategically, their lands were not subject to Roman occupation or construction until the fourth century. A second wave of Roman military activity appears to have occurred in the region during this later period in response to new military incursions and raiding by Saxons, Picti, Scoti and Attacotti. The east coast of the North York Moors area formed the northern flank of the Saxon Shore defences believed to have been constructed against this perceived threat.

The above explanations all place the causeway within a Roman military context. An alternative or perhaps secondary, usage for the causeway in Roman times is suggested by landscape author Michael Dunn and others, who state that it may have been constructed for the transport of jet inland from Whitby. Hayes and Rutter are dismissive, stating that the value of jet mined in the Roman period would not have justified the expense of the causeway's construction.

A possible issue with the causeway's identification as a Roman structure in the latter half of the twentieth century was its incorporation of many small bends along its course. Roman military roads are usually straight in both their overall course, and also typically from one vantage point to the next. Both the Foss Way and the Stanegate, roads of established Roman provenance, have sinuous courses similar to Wade's causeway, so the objection is not conclusive.

The use of dressed stone rather than gravel as a surface dressing was occasionally held to be a sign against Roman construction's causeway: the majority of Roman roads that were finished with a material other than simply packed earth were dressed in either packed gravel or pebbles. There are other examples of Roman roads paved with stone blocks, including the  section of the Via Appia—the oldest major Roman route in Italy—near Albano. The Roman writer Ulpian specifically differentiates between via munita, which always had a paved stone surface, and via glareata, which were earthed roads with either gravelled surfaces or a gravelled subsurface and paving on top. The causeway may well have had a gravel surface dressing originally, which has been removed since robbing and natural weathering. Another difference in construction detail between Wade's Causeway and a typical Roman road is its lack of a foundation of large stones. Codrington and archaeologist John Ward stress that the structure of Roman roads varied greatly depending upon their situation and the materials available, especially within Britain.

For much of the twentieth century, the consensus remained that the road was most probably Roman. It was still referenced as an undoubted Roman road in a 1947 UK Government report. In 1957 Margary, the leading authority on Roman roads at the time, accepted the road as Roman and assigned it the catalogue number 81b in his list of Roman roads in Britain. In the late 1950s and early 1960s, this was a definitive and unquestioned interpretation of the monument. Several works in the 1980s and 1990s stated that Roman-era road construction was still the most probable explanation of the structure.

As a pre-Roman or medieval road

Whilst nineteenth- and to a lesser extent twentieth-century attitudes often suggested that any well-constructed pre-modern road surface must be Roman, late-twentieth-century archaeologists were more open to evaluating the structure within the context of a wider span of historical periods. After an early allowance by Phillips in 1853 that the causeway could be British rather than Roman there was a little further investigation of such a possibility. In 1994, the Royal Commission on the Historical Monuments of England began reviewing the date of origin for the Wheeldale causeway. Detailed air photography of the Cawthorn camps in 1999 site failed to find evidence of a road leading towards Wheeldale Moor from the camps to which it is historically related,. The causeway does not obviously connect to the main Roman road network. Several writers around the turn of the millennium began to express doubt about the established narrative for the structure as a Roman road. Twenty-first-century archaeologists then found several exemplars of other cambered, metalled roads that pre-date the Roman presence in Britain, and hence set precedence for the possibility of a pre-Roman origin for the Wheeldale causeway. Several sources from the mid-1990s onwards have suggested that the structure may be a pre-Roman (Iron Age) road of uncertain route or purpose.

Blood and Markham (1992) have proposed an interpretation of the structure as a post-Roman (medieval) road, possibly relating to the wool trade,. However, this is harder to reconcile chronologically with etymological explanations for the structure's naming. English Heritage states that it is "quite possible" that the causeway was used as a road during the medieval period despite being built much earlier. Similarly, Hartley, whilst accepting the structure as a Roman military road, believes it is unlikely that the causeway immediately fell out of use once its military use ceased. Drake recorded that by 1736 the causeway was "not now made use of,"  but there is no historical record covering its possible use as a road during the medieval period.

As a neolithic boundary structure

There are some objections to the interpretation of the structure as being a road at all, including the fact that several burials cists along the structure's course protrude through its surface by up to 0.4m, highly unusual for a road surface. Since 1997, authorities, including English Heritage, have accepted the possibility that the structure may not be a road. Archaeological consultant Blaise Vyner suggested in 1997 that the structure may be the collapsed and heavily robbed remains of a Neolithic or Bronze Age boundary wall or dyke. There are other Neolithic remains on the North York Moors, including boundary dikes, although Knight et al. report that the later Neolithic is very poorly represented archaeologically in the North York Moors area and neolithic use of the moors was likely very limited in extent. Bronze Age presence in the moors, including earthworks, is well represented generally in the archaeology of the area, and therefore is a more plausible origin. Evidence against the identification of the causeway as an early Neolithic structure includes the statement by Elgee in 1912 that the causeway had been identified as cutting across an earlier British earthwork just north of Julian Park, suggesting that it must post-date it. One possibility that could explain several of the anomalies in trying to identify the site definitively is the suggestion by Knight et al. that it was commonly observed practice in the area for dykes to be reused as trackways.

The term "Wheeldale Linear Monument" was introduced in the 2010s to refer to the structure to account for the uncertainty regarding the structure's original function. English Heritage in 2013 stated that the balance of opinion had swung to favour a prehistoric, rather than Roman, the origin for the structure. , the uncertainty regarding the monument's purpose and origin is reflected by the information board at the end of the Wheeldale section of the structure, where it meets the modern road. The original sign, pictured in 1991 states that the structure is a Roman road, whereas new signage installed in 1998 admits that the origin and purpose of the structure are unknown.

Significance of uncertainty over the structure's origin

If Wade's Causeway is conclusively determined to be other than a Roman road, it would not be the only example of a long-standing misattribution of ancient structures as Roman roads. The most famous example is the Blackstone Edge Long Causeway, which was once acclaimed as one of the finest surviving Roman roads in Britain, and a structure around which there was "no doubt that ... [it] ... is Roman". It was accepted as Roman by archaeologists Hayes and Rutter, who also identified Wade's Causeway as Roman. Archaeologist James Maxim in 1965—a year after Hayes and Rutter published their findings on Wade's Causeway—stated that he had found a medieval pack-horse trail passing under Blackstone Edge, which it must therefore post-date. Subsequent research by the archaeological unit of the University of Manchester claimed that the Blackstone Edge road was most probably a turnpike dating from around 1735.

Site management in the modern era

The surviving section of the causeway on Wheeldale Moor was reported by 1903 to be overgrown with heather and up to a foot of soil. After being cleared of debris and overgrowth during excavations from 1910, it was by 1920 "stripped ... of the growth of turf and heather and ... clear for miles". The Office of Works then employed a labourer to keep the section of the causeway on Wheeldale Moor clear of vegetation, an arrangement that appears to have survived after that organisation's change to the Ministry of Works in 1943 and later absorption into the Department for the Environment in 1970. Johnston states that the site was still maintained in 1979, but by 1994 the visible section of the causeway had been left to be covered by vegetation once more.

Hayes and Rutter state that the greater postulated portion of the structure beyond that visible on Wheeldale Moor is difficult to trace due to its having been greatly damaged over the years by natural erosion, which they state has destroyed some sections. The structure as a whole has also been greatly damaged both deliberately and inadvertently by humans. As Ward writes, it is often the fate of historic structures such as roads to have "been levelled by the plough and plundered of their materials". There are specific mentions of damage to the causeway through ploughing, tree felling, the laying of water mains, attempts to clear vegetation and even, in the twentieth century, by the activity of both tracked  and armoured vehicles. The structure has also been heavily and deliberately robbed of stone for use in local construction, such as roads, dry-stone walls, dikes and farm buildings, this robbing continuing from 1586 through to at least the early twentieth century. Young, writing in 1817, laments the robbing of stone from the causeway for use in the construction of a modern field boundary, writing:

A change in attitudes and awareness of the structure's historical significance led to a gradual shift from destruction to preservation in the late nineteenth and early twentieth centuries. English Heritage states that limited repair work or alterations on the structure were likely carried out in the nineteenth century, but exact details are unclear. In 1913 the Wheeldale structure was brought under legal protection from robbing and deliberate damage, when its conservation was guaranteed under the Ancient Monuments Consolidation and Amendment Act. In 1982, a proposal was made to recover the majority of the exposed section with topsoil to protect it from further damage, but this has not been carried out . There was some further, limited maintenance of some sections between 1995 and 1997 to control water erosion, in addition to major erosion repair at the southern end of the structure in 1997.

There has been at least one report of deliberate vandalism to the structure,. Still, the primary concern relating to visitors to the site is the possibility of damage caused through tread wear. The site is not heavily trafficked, and any wear to the structure since the 1980s would likely be mitigated by the protection from the natural re-establishment of plant growth over its surface. Updates by the North York Moors National Park Authority and English Heritage suggest that natural weathering and grazing sheep represent greater erosion risks to the structure than do human agents.

, the site is managed by the North York Moors National Park Authority, in cooperation with English Heritage, through a Local Management Agreement. English Heritage does not man the site and permits free access at any reasonable time. The site receives up to a thousand visitors per month.

In fiction

Scottish Author Michael Scott Rohan drew on the legend of Wade's Causeway, as well as wider English, Germanic, and Norse mythology, when he wrote his Winter of the World trilogy while living in Yorkshire. The books feature mention of a legendary giant, Vayde, who ordered to be built a causeway across the marshes.

Other historical sites nearby 

English Heritage recognises the following historically significant sites close to Wade's Causeway:
 Cairnfield on Howl Moor 510m south of Wheeldale Lodge, including an unenclosed hut circle settlement, field system, and round burial cairns
 Simon Howe: a round cairn on Goathland Moor, two associated round barrows, a standing stone, and a stone alignment
 Field system and cairnfield on Lockton High Moor,  NNE of Needle Point
 Extensive prehistoric and medieval remains on Levisham Moor
 Two sections of Roman road on Flamborough Rigg
 Two sections of Roman road on Pickering Moor
 Cawthorn Roman forts and camp including a section of medieval trackway known as the Portergate
 Allan Tofts cairnfield, field system, burial cairns, and prehistoric rock art, immediately south of Morton Close

Photographs (1912–1985)

References and footnotes

Explanatory notes

α.The Roman Dunu[m|s] Sinus, which Young and Drake place at Whitby, and Hinderwell and Calvert suggest may be either the village of Dunsley, or the bay just north east of it.
β.Blaise Vyner classifies the structure as Neolithic, which would place its earliest possible construction date at around 4,500 BC. English Heritage suggest that it could be a medieval road. A traditional date for the medieval period is around 1066–1485, from the Battle of Hastings to the Battle of Bosworth Field (see for example the title of Saul's "Companion to Medieval England 1066–1485"), putting 1485 as the latest possible date of construction.
γ.Camden refers to a common practice of locals "digging sand out of [the Roman roads]".
δ.See Davidson and Hayes. Hayes and Rutter describe its Roman provenance as "undoubted".
ε.Hayes and Rutter find fault with Drake's description of the road's width, materials, and course.
ζ.See Elgee, Hayes, Codrington, and WNC Annual Report for 1956. The word "trod" is a general term in the North York Moors area for historical paths and trails: see Unsworth, Atherden, and Evans.
η.See Young, Hayes and Lee. Knapton states that the slabs are of dolomitic limestone, but all other sources state that the slabs are sandstone.
θ.Witcher points out that not all Roman roads should be thought of as arrow straight paved highways, and that "many were winding, unpaved, pre-existing routes". This is seconded by Ward.
ι.See, for example, Hayes, who describes it as "swampy and ill-drained" and attributes the perpendicular drainage culverts to this; also Ward, and Proceedings of the Cleveland Naturalists Field Club (1903–1904). There is some disagreement: Lang describes the North York Moors landscape during the Roman period as "arid".
κ.Several sources attest to the notion that Roman roads were predominantly straight: see, for example, PastScape, Gagarin. and Codrington. Codrington states further that there are examples of Roman roads that do not deviate more than a quarter of a mile from a direct line over a  course. Likewise, Davies states that at least one Roman road differs from a straight-line course between its termini by less than one degree over its entire course.
λ.See Wade, Clarke, Chadwick, and Bjork. Chadwick notes that the practice of attributing ancient structures to Dietrich von Berne or one of his associates was particularly common by German travellers of the Middle Ages.
μ.See Hinderwell, Drake, Davidson and Murray. Dillon says the legend involves sheep, but all other sources agree on it being cows.
ν.English Heritage state that "It has been assumed that the road is Roman, being carefully built and well-engineered".
ξ.See Bigland, Sheehan and Calvert.
ο.See Hinderwell and Drake.
π.See English Heritage and Heritage Explorer websites.
ρ.See Fellows, Edlin, and Historic England website.
σ.See Wade and Hayes.
τ.See Chambers and Searle.
υ.See Lukis, Camden (1607), Arnold (1882) and Hinde.
φ.See Wade and Camden.
χ.See Clarke, Nichols and Chambers.
ψ.See Grimm and Davidson.
ω.See Wansdyke Project website.
Α.See Sawyer and Bowden et al.
Β.See Young and WNC Annual Report for 1956.
Γ.See Chadwick and Wansdyke Project website.
Δ.See Hayes and English Heritage website.
Ε.See Unsworth and English Heritage website.
Ζ.See Darvill, Mattingly, Price, Knapton and Muir.
Η.See Hayes and Harrison.
Θ.See Codrington, Young, and Austen. Exact reported width varies from one source to another, presumably depending on whether they are measuring the surviving stonework only, or include one or both of the total agger width and the ditches on either side. Margary claims a width of 27 feet for the agger.
Ι.See Darvill, Pevsner, Barker, Mattingly, Elgee, Price, Knapton, Muir, Brown and Bigland.
Κ.See Atkinson, Hartley and PCNC (1901).
Λ.See Historic England website.
Μ.See Muir, Barker, Bevan, Price, Weston and Heritage Trail website.
Ν.See Codrington and WNC Annual Reports (1956).
Ξ.See Drake and Lewis.
Ο.See English Heritage and Heritage Trust websites and WNC Annual Report (1994).
Π.See Hinderwell and Hayes.
Ρ.See Knox, Young and Home.
Σ.See Hayes and Young.
Τ.See Codrington and Home.
Υ.See Lee, PastScape website and WNC Annual Reports (1995, 1996, 1997).
Φ.See Lee and WNC Annual Report (1996).
Χ.See Ward and WNC Annual Report (1994).
Ψ.See WNC Annual Report (1995) and NYMNP Wordpress blog.
Ω.See Codrington and BBC Countryfile website.
Ϊ.See Heritage Explorer website and WNC Annual Report (1956).
Ϋ.See Pastscape, Archaeological Research Services. and English Heritage websites.
ά.See Hayes and WNC Annual Report (1956).
έ.See Elgee and Oswald.
ή.See WNC Annual Report (1956) and English Heritage website. Margary and Yorkshire Archaeological Society annual reports state that the work continued 1912–1915 only, but several other sources mention a break in work during the first world war.
ί.See Lee and the PastScape website.
ΰ.See Hayes, Williams and Selkirk.
ϊ.See Williams Heseltine (2005) and Birmingham Roman Roads Project website.
ϋ.See Gabriel and Grant.
ό.See Codrington and Ward.
ύ.See Muir and Price.
ώ.See, for example, Ward (1911), Malim and Bigland (1812)
Ϗ.See Lang and Geake.
β.See Malim and Morris.
θ.See Unsworth, PastScape and English Heritage websites, and WNC Annual Report (1997).
ϒ.See Anttila, Johnson, Atkin and Sedgefield for definitions and commentary on the origins and alternative meanings for skeid.
ΐ.See Online Etymology Dictionary, Johnson, Heath and Sedgefield for discussion of vik.
ϔ.See Schleifer and Oxford English Dictionary.
Φ.Wade reports that Wright, who he describes as the "standard authority on the saxon era, is of the opinion that all tradition of Wade is of the earliest Teutonic origin".
ϖ.See, for example title of Fleming's Anglo-Saxon Britain: 410 to 1066 in Carpenter (2003), and BBC website.
ϗ.See, for example Jones, Carpenter (2003) and BBC website.
Ϙ.See, for example Hindle and Welfare.
ϙ.Hayes declares that he "failed to disclose any definite traces ... in the neighbourhood of Amotherby and Newsham", found "no definite evidence ... in the vicinity of Little Habton and Great Barugh", and "no concrete evidence" between Riseborough Hill and the Cawthorn Camps.
Ϛ.See, for example, Chambers Codrington, and Hayes for etymological discussions of the various names for the structure, and their impact on an understanding of its likely date of construction.
ϛ.See, for example, Hinderwell, Bigland, Young Knox and the Pastscape website for evaluations of the structure as a Roman road in connection with Cawthorn Roman camps.
Ϝ.See, for example, discussions in Johnston and on the English Heritage website.
Ϟ.See, for example, statements by both Margary (1973) and Wilkinson (2007).
ϟ.See, for example, Brown (1948), Ormsby-Gore (1951), and Pevsner (1966).
Ϡ.See brief mentions given in Barker as well as Patterson's letter stating his position.
ϡ.See attributions to the duchy in Vyner, Beardsall, Hayes and Rutter, and Barker.
Ϣ.See Hayes and Rutter (1964). Hartley (1993), as well as secondary cite in Barker (1977).
ϣ.See both the Heritage Gateway and PastScape websites for mention of the Blood/Markham study.
Ϥ.See Skivick spelling and attribution in Hayes (1964) and Skivik spelling and attribution in Hayes (1988).
Ϧ.See varying estimates in Lewis, Hayes, and Hawkes.
ϧ.See, for example, Brown and Sheehan/Whellan.
Ϩ.See Hayes (1964) and Elgee (1933).
Ϫ.See Johnston and Pevsner.
ϫ.See Oulton, Phillips, The Antiquary (Vol 51) (1915) and Academy and Literature (1904).
Ϭ.See Sheehan (1859) and Turner (1890).
Ϯ.See, for example Transactions of the Historic Society of Lancashire and Cheshire (1914) and Contemporary Review (Vol 116) (1919).
κ.See, for example, Dunn (1986) and Hartley (1993).
ρ.See, for example, Chadwick (1932) and Reaney (2006).
϶.See, for example Shotter (2005), Hartley (1993) and Elgee (1930), the latter whom suggests also Agricola's predecessor Cerealis.
ϼ.See Mattingly (2007), Muir (1997), Algeo (2010), Turner (1840) Freeman (1870), and Frere (1987).
Ͼ.See Lindow (2001) and Dumézil (1973).
ϻ. See Lawrence (2010) and Heseltine (2005).
Ͽ.See Transactions of the Historic Society of Lancashire and Cheshire (1914) and Contemporary Review (Vol 116) (1919).
Ͻ.See Dillon (2005), Muir (1997), Pearson (2002) and Sarantis (2013).
ϸ.See Knight et al. (2011), Powell (2012) and NYNPA Minerals Technical Paper (2013).

Citations

Bibliography

Printed books 

Online: 

Online: 

Online: 

 Online: 

Online: 

 Online:

Online access

eBooks

Journals and technical papers

Printed newsletters

eJournals, brochures and technical papers

Online newspapers

Miscellaneous websites 
 
 
 
  
 
 

  
  
  
 
 
  
  
  
  
  
  
  
 
  
 
 
 
 
 
 
 
 
 
 
 

Archaeological sites in North Yorkshire
Archaeological sites in Yorkshire
Scheduled monuments in North Yorkshire
Germanic mythology
Yorkshire folklore
English Heritage sites in Yorkshire
Ancient trackways in England
North York Moors